Pyeongchon-dong (평촌동, 坪村洞) is neighborhood of Dongan district in the city of Anyang, Gyeonggi Province, South Korea.

External links
 Pyeongchon-dong 

Dongan-gu
Neighbourhoods in Anyang, Gyeonggi